Blue Force is an adventure game for MS-DOS released in 1993 by former Police Quest designer Jim Walls.

Gameplay
The game has certain similarities to Police Quest, but has a constant inventory menu and points counter at the bottom, a dynamic displaying menu with five options (look, interact, walk, talk and options menu) and a police motorbike interface system. On the motorbike, the player can use the Ignition to travel to a destination and must use the radio to contact police headquarters when necessary and click the appropriate codes that match the situation. It is essential that the player calls for backup when dealing with criminals.

Plot
In 1995, Jake Ryan is a rookie police officer. Jake's father was a police officer, which prompted Jake to join the force. Jake's father was killed in the line of duty in 1984 and his case has not yet been solved. While playing the game, Jake uncovers clues to his father's murder.

Jake graduates at the top of his class and joins the Jackson Beach PD, the same force his dad was on. He makes several arrests in connection with a National Guard armory break-in. Just as he is about to tie these crimes in with his father's murder, Jake is in a car accident while riding his police motorcycle. After spending weeks in rehab, his father's old partner offers him a job as his assistant in his private investigation firm, and Jake accepts. Eventually, the two discover a massive gun smuggling ring, tied to three main individuals: a man named Bradford Green, Stuart Cox, the Jackson Beach district attorney, and Nico Dillon, the person who murdered Jake's father. The game ends with Nico being sentenced to receive a lethal injection, Bradford Green being sentenced to 20 years in prison, and Stuart Cox being sentenced to 15 years in prison.

Reception

Computer Gaming Worlds Charles Ardai in 1993 stated that Blue Force "is simply not as strong as Walls' previous games". He criticized the game world ("prop-up facades"), "abysmal" dialogues, "appalling spelling errors and factual inconsistencies", and slow speed. Ardai concluded that "Walls and Tsunami both have better work in them ... they have nowhere to go but up".

In 1996, Computer Gaming World declared Blue Force the 37th-worst computer game ever released.

See also
Codename: ICEMAN, another game designed by Jim Walls

References

1993 video games
Adventure games
DOS games
DOS-only games
Point-and-click adventure games
ScummVM-supported games
Single-player video games
Video games developed in the United States
Video games set in 1984
Video games set in 1995
Video games about police officers
Tsunami Games games